Rübeland is a village in the district of Harz in the German state of Saxony-Anhalt. Since 2004, it has been given the additional description of Höhlenort ("cave site"). The sub-districts of Rübeland are Susenburg, Kaltes Tal, Kreuztal and Neuwerk. Since 1 January 2010, it is part of the town Oberharz am Brocken and has 959 inhabitants.

Location 
Rübeland lies in the Harz mountains on the river Bode. The Rübeland Railway and B 27 federal road run through it, a link road to the B 81 branching off in the centre of the village. South of the village stretches the Rappbode Reservoir. The bedrock in the region around Rübeland consists of Middle to Upper Devonian limestones of the Elbingerode Complex, that break the surface as crags in the area of the Bode Valley.

Places of interest 
 Schornsteinberg, a viewing point on a crag with excellent views of the valley and the village. Checkpoint no. 89 in the Harzer Wandernadel hiking network.

References

External links 

  Höhlenort Rübeland
  Rübeland Cave Games
 Information on the Rübeland Lime Works by Fels-Werke

Former municipalities in Saxony-Anhalt
Oberharz am Brocken
Duchy of Brunswick